Palaeomolva is an extinct genus of prehistoric bony fish.

See also

 Prehistoric fish
 List of prehistoric bony fish

References

Prehistoric bony fish genera